The Tomb of the Prophets Haggai, Zechariah and Malachi (Arabic: قبر النبيا Qubur El Anbiyya, lit. "Grave (of) The Prophets"; Hebrew: מערת הנביאים, "Cave of the Prophets") is an ancient burial site located on the upper western slope of the Mount of Olives, Jerusalem. According to a medieval Jewish tradition also adopted by Christians, the catacomb is believed to be the burial place of Haggai, Zechariah and Malachi, the last three Hebrew Bible prophets who are believed to have lived during the 6th-5th centuries BC. Archaeologists have dated the three earliest burial chambers to the 1st century BC, thus contradicting the tradition.

Burial chamber
The chamber forms two concentric passages containing 38 burial niches. The entrance to the large rock-cut burial cave is on the western side, where a staircase descends, flanked on both sides by a stone balustrade. A third tunnel runs in another direction. They are all connected by cross galleries, the outer one of which measures  in length.

Research shows that the complex actually dates from the 1st-century BCE, when this style of tombs came into use for Jewish burial. Some Greek inscriptions discovered at the site suggest the cave was re-used to bury foreign Christians during the 4th and 5th centuries CE. On one of the side walls of the vault, a Greek inscription translates:
Put thy faith in God, Dometila: No human creature is immortal!

Holy site

The site has been venerated by the Jews since the Middle Ages, and they often visited the site. In 1882, Archimandrite Antonine (Kapustin) acquired the location for the Russian Orthodox Church. He planned to build a church at the site, which aroused strong protests by the Jews who visited and worshipped at the cave. The Ottoman courts ruled in 1890 that the transaction was binding but the Russians agreed not to display Christian symbols or icons at the site which was to remain accessible for people of all faiths.

External links
 (he) The Tombs of the Prophets archive on the website of the Israel Antiquities Authority.

References

Buildings and structures completed in the 1st century BC
Archaeological sites in Jerusalem
Burial monuments and structures
Haggai, Zechariah and Malachi
Jewish pilgrimage sites
Shrines in Jerusalem
Rock-cut tombs
Ancient Jewish history
Mount of Olives
Russian Orthodox Church Outside of Russia
Book of Haggai
Book of Zechariah
Book of Malachi
Tombs in the State of Palestine